Felicia C. Adams (born May 12, 1960) is an American attorney who served as United States Attorney for the United States District Court for the Northern District of Mississippi from 2011 to 2017.

Education
Adams graduated in 1981 from Jackson State University, and in 1984 from the University of Mississippi School of Law.

Career
From 1984 to 1985, Adams was a law clerk for Odell Horton of the United States District Court for the Western District of Tennessee.  Adams worked as legal counsel in the Mississippi's governor’s office from 1988 to 1989, and was an Assistant United States Attorney for the United States District Court for the Northern District of Mississippi from 1989 to 2000.  In 2000, Adams was appointed assistant United States Attorney for the United States District Court for the Southern District of Mississippi.  From 2011 to 2017, Adams served as United States Attorney for the United States District Court for the Northern District of Mississippi.

See also
2017 dismissal of U.S. attorneys

References

1960 births
Living people
African-American lawyers
Assistant United States Attorneys
Jackson State University alumni
Mississippi Democrats
United States Attorneys for the Northern District of Mississippi
University of Mississippi School of Law alumni
American women lawyers
American lawyers
21st-century African-American people
21st-century African-American women
20th-century African-American people
20th-century African-American women